The siege of Fallujah was an offensive that the Iraqi government launched against ISIL in Al-Karmah and in the city of Fallujah, with the aim of enforcing a siege of Fallujah. During the operation, local Sunni residents revolted against ISIL for a period of 3 days, in February 2016. On 22 May, after completing preparations around the city, the Iraqi Army and supporting Shi'ite militias launched the Third Battle of Fallujah.

Background

On 4 January 2014, ISIL, then known as the al-Qaeda-affiliated Islamic State of Iraq, captured the city of Fallujah, after Iraqi government forces withdrew from the city, following a 5-day battle. This victory allowed ISIL to capture its first city on Iraqi soil, and it also allowed them to establish a stronghold only 40 kilometers (25 miles) from the Iraqi capital of Baghdad.

From April to May 2015, the Iraqi Army launched an offensive in and around the town of Al-Karmah. During the offensive, the Iraqi Army made some limited gains in the Al-Karmah, by capturing some territory in the town and building a base for a future assault to fully recapture both Fallujah and Al-Karmah.

In mid-May 2015, ISIL captured Ramadi, after a large series of suicide attacks during a sandstorm prompted Iraqi forces to abandon the city to ISIL. Two months later, the Iraqi Security Forces recovered from their loss in the Anbar's provincial capital, and on 13 July 2015, launched an offensive to recapture the Anbar Province. During the offensive, ISIL suffered a major blow, after they lost Ramadi to Iraqi government forces in February 2016.

On 1 February, the Iraqi Army launched an offensive on the Khalidiya Island area, which is the region located between the villages Albu Nasir and Albu Shajal, situated between Ramadi and Fallujah. On the same day, the Iraqi Army managed to capture the villages of Albu Shalib and Albu Shajal, to the northwest of Fallujah.

The offensive

Total siege
On 2 February, the Iraqi Army fully severed the last supply lines between the Khalidiya Island region and the city of Fallujah, completely besieging the city. This led to concerns that an estimated 30,000–60,000 civilians trapped in Fallujah would starve, due to the lack of airdropped supplies into the city. On 10 February, it was reported that the Iraqi Army had fully recaptured the Khalidiya District, including the Khalidiya Island area.

Fallujah revolt and Al-Karmah offensive
From 15 to 19 February, the Iraqi Army launched an offensive into the town of Al-Karmah, to the northeast of Fallujah, killing dozens of ISIL militants.

On 18 February, a large number of local Sunni tribesmen revolted against ISIL, after ISIL beat a woman, among other restrictive practices enforces by ISIL's Al-Hisbah secret police, amid an ongoing siege. ISIL was reported to have withdrawn into Fallujah city, after local Sunnis burned the Al-Hisbah headquarters and clashes spread. On 20 February, the clashes began to die down as ISIL began carrying out mass arrests, and it was reported that there were still some Sunni fighters who were pinned down in parts of Fallujah, who would likely be massacred if the Iraqi Government or the US-led Coalition did not intervene. On 21 February, the Iraqi Army began shelling ISIL positions on the outskirts of Fallujah, in support of the Sunni tribal fighters. Late on 21 February, ISIL crushed the revolt, and detained 180 men. However, on the same day, the Iraqi Army deployed reinforcements to Fallujah, in preparation to storm the city.

On 23 February, the Iraqi Army fully recaptured the town of Al-Karmah, after they destroyed ISIL's last stronghold in the town.

On 24 February, a Coalition airstrike killed 30 ISIL militants in the Karama sub-district, just east of Fallujah.

Tightening the siege
On 25 February, the Iraqi Governor of Anbar stated that the battle for Fallujah would begin soon, and that it would be much shorter than the battle for Ramadi. On the same day, the Iraqi Army tightened their siege on Fallujah, pushing into the outskirts of Fallujah, and securing all of the bridges leading into the city. On the same day, the Iraqi Army cleared the Albu Daeig district in southern Fallujah, killing 19 ISIL militants. It was also reported that ISIL was using food as a weapon in Fallujah, denying food supplies to the people it suspected of having links to the rebel tribesmen or being non-ISIL sympathizers.

On 27 February, the Iraqi Government reported that 600 ISIL fighters had managed to flee Fallujah to nearby areas, and to the city of Mosul. After the defections, local sources estimated that there were only 400 ISIL militants remaining in Fallujah city. On 28 February, the Shi'ite militia forces repelled an ISIL attack on Al-Karmah, which was described as one of the largest attacks on the town. Later on the same day, Iraqi government forces repelled a massive ISIL suicide attack in Abu Ghraib and western Baghdad, which was the largest attack carried out by the group in the area in nearly 2 years. The assault left 48 ISIL militants and 23 Iraqi soldiers dead.

On 4 April, Iraqi Security Forces killed 150 ISIL fighters near Fallujah. Coalition spokesman Col. Steve Warren said that U.S. forces in Iraq couldn't confirm of the number of extremist fighters killed, but some 100 militants were killed on the same day by airstrikes conducted by the U.S.-led Coalition, which could have been part of the tally.

On 6 April, eight Iraqi soldiers were killed in an attack launched by ISIL on a military barracks in al-Ma'amel village, east of Fallujah. On 9 April, ten civilians were killed and 25 others were injured after airstrikes and artillery shelling by the Iraqi Army targeted the al-Fallujah market and Nezal district in the downtown area of the city. On 10 April, six ISIL militants were killed by the Iraqi army's artillery shelling in the area of Falahat, west of the city.

On 21 April, the US-led Coalition conducted an airstrike on an ISIL gathering in the Ahsi area near Amiriyah Fallujah, killing the top ISIL commander in southern Fallujah, along with six of his assistants. On 26 April, warplanes bombarded a number of areas in al-Resala, central Fallujah, resulting in the death of eight civilians, including three children, and wounding 13 others. On 27 April, six ISIL militants were killed and five others were wounded, when the Iraqi Army pounded ISIL positions in the city with artillery. On 28 April, Coalition aircraft conducted three airstrikes on ISIL headquarters in the al-Rofah area, north of al-Karma District, killing 15 ISIL terrorists, including three leaders, named Khattab al-Halabusi, Aush al-Shami,  and Mosadaq Abdel Galil. Meanwhile, an ISIL vehicle carrying machine guns was also destroyed.

On 30 April, unidentified fighters attacked a gathering of ISIL militants near the Alwa area in the al-Joulan neighborhood, in central Fallujah killing seven ISIL militants. On 2 May, security forces carried out a large-scale military operation targeting ISIL gatherings in the al-Falahat area, killing 15 ISIL members and injuring ten others, as well as bombing a laboratory for manufacturing booby-trapped vehicles.

On 3 May, the Iraqi Army and allied militia forces launched an offensive in the southern Fallujah area, capturing the areas between Amiriyah and Fallujah city. By the next day, Iraqi Government forces had come within 3 kilometers of Fallujah's southern entrance, capturing 4 villages, killing 100 ISIL militants, and destroying 10 ISIL tunnels. On 5 May, Anbar Operations Commander Major General Ismail Mahlawi told Anadolu Agency that the Iraqi army had captured five areas of the city.

On the morning of 5 May, violent clashes broke out between two factions belonging to ISIS in Nazzal neighborhood in central Fallujah, after the theft of 700 million dinars that were deposited with one of ISIS leaders called Jabbar Auf, resulting in the killing of ten ISIS members and injuring eight others.

On 7 May, security forces conducted operations that targeted the headquarters and gatherings of ISIS in the areas of al-Hur and Zebin al-Hanshl in the vicinity of Amiriyah Fallujah, resulting in the death of 25 ISIS elements.

On 8 May, Coalition warplanes carried out an airstrike on ISIL positions in south of Fallujah, killing 14 ISIL militants. Warplanes also destroyed three car bombs and killed their suicide bombers as they were trying to attack the Iraqi Security Forces in the same area near Fallujah.

On 9 May, Iraqi Air Force bombarded two ISIL buildings, two caches of weapons, and 60 rocket launchers in the area of Albu Shehab and Amiriyah Fallujah. Earlier on same the day, 20 ISIL militants were killed during an aerial bombardment in south of Fallujah. From 4–9 May, 140 ISIL militants were killed in clashes in the western and southern suburbs of Fallujah.

On 10 May, it was reported that 2,000 families were trapped in two villages, Albu Huwa and Hasai, and were being used as human shields by ISIL.

On 11 May, eight ISIL militants were killed and two more were wounded, as Coalition airplanes conducted two airstrikes against a booby-trapped ISIL vehicle near the Fallahat and Halabisah villages.

On 14 May, ISIL forces claimed to have killed 100+ Iraqi forces in a large suicide attack at the residential compound in Amiriyah Fallujah. Another report put the death toll at 70 soldiers and one policeman.

Aftermath – late May offensive

On 22 May, after a prolonged siege, the Iraqi army announced that it was building up its forces around Fallujah, in preparation for a large-scale assault on the city that would soon be initiated. According to Iraqi military leaders, these plans are in place to build on the momentum from a recent victory against ISIL in the town of Rutbah, they are also in place to degrade ISIL's ability to conduct suicide bombings in Baghdad; the recent attacks that killed 200 civilians are widely believed to have come out of Fallujah. The army sent messages to besieged residents to "be prepared to leave Fallujah through secured routes that will be announced later." According to UNHCR, 80 families have managed to escape before 24 May, however, the danger is made clear through civilian contacts who said that ISIL death squads "will kill anybody in Fallujah who leaves their house or waves a white flag."

The Popular Mobilization Forces declared on 23 May that they had captured al-Karmah, about 16 kilometers (10 miles) northeast of Falluja, which brings most of the territory east of Falluja under government control. They also announced the liberation of al-Harariyat, al-Shahabi and al-Dwaya and the killing of 40 ISIL militants during the military operation. Iraqi government announced that pro-government fighters had captured the villages of Luhaib and Albu Khanfar on 24 May.

On 25 May, 16 towns and districts on the eastern outskirts of Fallujah were cleared by Iraqi security forces. Included in this were the gains from a column in the North-East, which liberated the town of Sejar days after the capture of Karma. These clashes resulted in the death of 40 ISIL militants. An additional 123 ISIL militants, 15 civilians and 35 Iraqi forces and militiamen were killed in clashes which gained the Iraqi army control over the remaining districts in the South-East, allowing them to create a corridor that cut the ISIL-controlled-zone in two. According to Qasm Araji, a member of the defense committee, the advancing forces are continuously gaining ground and "nearing Fallujah's Eastern gate."

Humanitarian disaster

As the siege tightened, tens of thousands of Iraqis, trapped in Fallujah, were left without regular access to food and medicine, as shortages intensified. While Iraqi authorities stated that there were 50,000 people left in the city during the siege, local sources said the number was as high as 196,000. Many human rights experts deemed the situation in Fallujah as a humanitarian disaster, and the situation only became more dire after 22 May 2016, when the Iraqi army launched a direct assault on the city.
Supplies were available in some stores, but only for ISIL fighters or sympathizers, according to local reports. Iraqi officials said that negotiations led by the International Red Cross have been were going on in an attempt to get ISIL to allow some aid teams to enter into the city and provide basic assistance. Hekmat Sulaiman, the spokesperson for Anbar's Governor, said that the Iraqi Army had tried to deliver food to the civilians, but that ISIL had blocked the efforts. A senior federal security official confirmed the negotiations, but declined to specify whether the talks were happening with ISIL leaders inside the city, or elsewhere. The Iraqi government did not prepare the residents of Fallujah with assistance before cutting off supply lines.
Further, infrastructure of the city of Fallujah was in the process of being destroyed by airstrikes. Houses, schools, sewage pipes, and electric and water lines became increasingly unusable by the residents left in the city, and there were documented reports that women and children were forced to sleep outside in the harsh weather. Some residents reported that they had no fuel to heat themselves during the cold winter. Many residents were unable to access the medical care and supplies they needed, an issue which intensified after Fallujah hospital was shelled during the subsequent offensive in late May.

Enforced disappearances and executions

As the Iraqi Army tightened its grip on the city, local reports indicated that ISIL grew bloodier and more desperate. On 30 March, a commander of the Iraqi Popular Mobilization units, Colonel Mahmoud Mardi Jumaili said ISIL killed 35 people in the central district Fallujah on Wednesday after accusing them of attempting to escape from the city. On 4 April, ISIL burned 15 civilians to death for trying to escape Fallujah. On 14 April, a security source said ISIL militants began a massive offensive in the al-Halabese and al-Bualawan areas of Western Fallujah, abducting at least 100 Iraqi civilians. ISIL elements took the abducted civilians to the organization's prisons in the city. ISIL death squads were roaming the streets, saying they will kill anybody in Fallujah who leaves their house or waves a white flag.

Iraqi pro-government militia groups also participated in systematically abducting and executing civilians who fled the area, claiming that they were associated with ISIS. It has since become clear that (Shia) militia groups deliberately targeted families who were known to be Sunni Arabs for the furtherance of their sectarian agenda. In several instances, entire families were either disappeared or executed, which lent evidence to the fact that fighting ISIS was often a pretext. Most of those civilians abducted by the militias were disappeared; to this day, their location remains unknown.

In 2020, the United Nations Assistance Mission in Iraq (UNAMI) and the Office of the United Nations High Commissioner for Human Rights (OHCHR) published a report regarding the enforced disappearances from Anbar governorate during this time. Evidence included in the report estimated that around 1,000 civilians were subject to enforced disappearances and "related violations." However, there is credible evidence that the number of individuals forcibly disappeared from Fallujah and surrounding areas, both during the siege and in the subsequent battle, is much higher. The report also notes that little progress has been made in locating forcibly disappeared civilians.

For more information on violations in 2015-2016 in the Anbar governorate, see Third Battle of Fallujah.

See also

 Al-Hawl offensive
 Battle of Baiji (2014–15)
 Battle of Baiji (October–December 2014)
 December 2014 Sinjar offensive
 Derna Campaign (2014–15)
 Fall of Hīt (2014)
 Fall of Mosul
 First Battle of Tikrit
 List of wars and battles involving ISIL
 Military intervention against ISIL
 American-led intervention in Syria
 Mosul offensive (2015)
 November 2015 Sinjar offensive
 Second Battle of Tikrit (March–April 2015)
 Siege of Amirli
 Siege of Kobanî
 Sinjar massacre
 Tishrin Dam offensive
 Al-Shaddadi offensive (2016)
 Hīt offensive (2016)
 Ar-Rutbah offensive (2016)

References

Conflicts in 2016
Military operations of the Iraqi Civil War in 2016
Military operations of the War in Iraq (2013–2017) involving the Islamic State of Iraq and the Levant
Fallujah
Military operations of the War in Iraq (2013–2017) involving the Iraqi government
Military operations of the War in Iraq (2013–2017) involving the United States